Ore Iravu is a 1951 Indian Tamil-language film directed by P. Neelakantan and co-written by him and C. N. Annadurai. Produced by AVM Productions, it is based on Annadurai's play of the same name. The film stars K. R. Ramasamy, reprising his role from the play. It was released on 11 April 1951 and received well by critics, but failed commercially.

Plot 

A thief breaks into a rich man's house without knowing that the man is his own father who had abandoned him and his mother long ago.

Cast 

Male cast
K. R. Ramasamy as Rathnam
T. K. Shanmugam as Karunakarathevar
T. S. Balaiah as Jagaveeran
A. Nageswara Rao as Dr. Sekhar
T. S. Durairaj as Compounder 'Eman'
'Friend' Ramasami as Agarathi
S. Venkatraman as Rioter
N. S. Narayana Pillai as Kanaka Pillai
Duraisami as Thatha
T. S. Dakshinamurthy as Public Prosecutor

Female cast
Lalitha as Susheela
B. S. Saroja as Swarnam
Muthulakshmi as Bhavani
Angamuthu as Maid
Sukumari (debut film)
Dance
Lalitha-Padmini
Kumari Kamala
Lakshmikantham

Choreographers
Vazhuvoor Ramaiah Pillai
B. Hiralal

Production 
Or Iravu was a stage play written by C. N. Annadurai. It was originally written for K. R. Ramasamy's Krishnan memorial drama company by Annadurai. A. V. Meiyappan of AVM Productions decided to make a film based on the play. Annadurai was paid 10,000 for writing the screenplay. Annadurai went to AVM studios and wrote the entire script and dialogues totalling 300 pages in a single night. The screenplay was later modified by the director and the producer of the film. This was the third film to be made based on Annadurai's plays after Velaikari (1949) and Nallathambi (1949). P. Neelakantan, who had begun working for AVM in the 1947 film Naam Iruvar as assistant director, made his directorial debut with this film. Per Annadurai's recommendation, Ramasamy was hired to play the hero, reprising his role from the play. The play depicted events that happen in a single night, and older incidents were depicted using flashbacks, but in the film version, flashbacks were replaced with a linear narration. The completed film was 14,980 feet in length.

Soundtrack 
The music was composed by R. Sudarsanam ("Thunbam Nergaiyil Yaazhedutthu" is based on a composition by Dandapani Desikar). Lyrics were by Mahakavi Bharathiyar, Bharathidasan, T. K. Shanmugam, K. P. Kamatchi Sundharam & Ku. Ma. Balasubramaniam. The song "Ayya Saami Aaoji Saami" is based on "Chico Chico from Puerto Rico" from the 1945 American film Doll Face.

Songs list

Release and reception 
Or Iravu was released on 11 April 1951. The film was a box office failure, but was received well by critics and contemporary writers of Annadurai. Meiyappan theorised that the film failed either due to the modifications made to the original script or the changes the director did to adapt it for the big screen.

References

Bibliography

External links 

1950s Tamil-language films
Films scored by R. Sudarsanam
1951 directorial debut films
1951 films
AVM Productions films
Films directed by P. Neelakantan
Indian drama films
Indian films based on plays